Emir Faccioli (born 5 August 1989 in Margarita) is an Argentine footballer, who plays as a centre-back for Defensores de Belgrano in the Primera Nacional.

Career
He is known in South America as an up-and-coming player and has received positive comments from players such as Diego Maradona and Diego Simeone. He has also played for Argentine youth teams as a youngster.

In February 2010, Faccioli was strongly linked with Italian club Palermo, but in July he was loaned to Frosinone Calcio.

External links
 Argentine Primera statistics

1989 births
Living people
People from Vera Department
Argentine footballers
Argentine expatriate footballers
Association football defenders
Sportspeople from Santa Fe Province
Club Atlético Lanús footballers
Frosinone Calcio players
Godoy Cruz Antonio Tomba footballers
Defensa y Justicia footballers
Club Atlético Colón footballers
Unión de Santa Fe footballers
All Boys footballers
Club Atlético Brown footballers
Guabirá players
Gimnasia y Esgrima de Jujuy footballers
Defensores de Belgrano footballers
Argentine Primera División players
Primera Nacional players
Serie B players
Bolivian Primera División players
Argentine expatriate sportspeople in Italy
Argentine expatriate sportspeople in Bolivia
Expatriate footballers in Italy
Expatriate footballers in Bolivia